Manlee Kongprapad (20 January 1884 - 5 November 1971) was a Thai dancer. She was known for her outstanding ability to feature in various characters and roles. For Khon, she could even alter the men's role, making her a notable Thai dancer at her time amongst the royal personnel.

Life 
Manlee was born in Bangkok Yai District on 20 January 1884. She fell in love with dance at an early age and overcame a humble upbringing to distinguish herself within royal circles as a renowned performer and later as a teacher.

On 20 January 2019, Google Doodle featured her on the Google Thailand website.

References 

Manlee Kongprapad
Manlee Kongprapad
1884 births
1971 deaths